Tattoo of Blood is the debut studio album of Captain Howdy, released on March 5, 1996 by Shimmy Disc. It is a collaboration between musician and producer Kramer and magician Penn Jillette.

Track listing

Personnel 
Adapted from Tattoo of Blood liner notes.

Captain Howdy
 Penn Jillette – vocals
 Kramer – instruments, production, engineering
Additional musicians
 Soma Allpass – cello
 Debbie Harry – vocals
 Billy West – guitar

Production and additional personnel
Alan Douches – mastering
Tony Fitzpatrick – cover art
Michael Macioce – photography

Release history

References

External links 
 

 Tattoo of Blood at YouTube (streamed copy where licensed)

1996 debut albums
Captain Howdy (band) albums
Albums produced by Kramer (musician)
Shimmy Disc albums